Stephen Barlow (born 1973) is an Australian-born London-based opera director. He was educated at Melbourne Grammar School and the University of Melbourne. He has directed more than 50 operas worldwide for many major companies including the Metropolitan Opera New York, Glyndebourne Festival Opera, the Royal Opera, Covent Garden, San Francisco Opera, Lyric Opera of Chicago, Santa Fe Opera, Opéra de Monte-Carlo, Opera Holland Park (London), Scottish Opera, The Grange Festival, Central City Opera, (Colorado), Singapore Lyric Opera, Mid Wales Opera, British Youth Opera, Guildhall School of Music and Drama, the Royal College of Music, the Royal Northern College of Music, the Royal Academy of Music and University College Opera, London. He has also worked for the Royal National Theatre, London and the Mariinsky Theatre (formerly Kirov) in St Petersburg.

In the Autumn of 2011 he staged the opening production of the Wexford Festival Opera's 60th anniversary season - La cour de Célimène by Ambroise Thomas. These were the first performances of the opera since its premiere in Paris in 1855 and this production was nominated for the Irish Times Best Opera Production Award.

In 2015 Barlow staged a new production of Andrew Lloyd Webber's Phantom of the Opera in Bucharest, which was the Romanian premiere of the piece. In 2018 Barlow directed the same production at Folketeatret in Oslo which was be the Norwegian premiere of the show, and in 2020 Barlow presented the Greek premiere of Phantom of the Opera.

Also in 2015 Barlow staged the London professional premiere production of Jonathan Dove's Flight (opera) at Opera Holland Park and subsequently the Scottish professional premiere production for Scottish Opera in 2018.

Sources
Tommasini, Anthony, "Puccini and Operetta? He Does It His Way", New York Times, 1 January 2009

External links
 

Australian opera directors
Living people
Theatre directors from Melbourne
University of Melbourne alumni
British opera directors
1973 births